The Vineland Adaptive Behavior Scale is a psychometric instrument used in child and adolescent psychiatry and clinical psychology.  It is used especially in the assessment of individuals with an intellectual disability, a pervasive developmental disorder, and other types of developmental delays.

History
The Vineland Adaptive Behavior Scale was first published in 1984, as a revision of the Vineland Social Maturity Scale, which is named after Vineland Training School in Vineland, New Jersey where Edgar Doll had developed it.

In 2005, Vineland-II was published, which added a 4th domain of motor skills, and in 2016 Vineland-3 was published, where the overall number of items on the scale increased by 34%.

Purpose
The Vineland Adaptive Behavior Scale assesses a person's adaptive level of functioning by standardized interview of the person or their caregiver through their activities of daily living such as walking, talking, getting dressed, going to school, preparing a meal, etc. The original Vineland interview assessed three domains: communication, socialization and daily living, which correspond to the 3 domains of adaptive functioning recognized by the American Association on Intellectual and Developmental Disabilities namely conceptual skills (language and literacy, mathematics, time and number concepts, and self-direction), social skills and practical skills of daily living.

Limitations
Since no gold standard for evaluation of adaptive behavior exists, the test validity of this tool is unknown.

See also 
 Vineland Social Maturity Scale

References

Screening and assessment tools in child and adolescent psychiatry
Intellectual disability